Teatro Tereza Rachel is a theatre in Rio de Janeiro, Brazil.

References

Theatres in Rio de Janeiro (city)